Kathleen Collins Becker is an American politician who served in the Colorado House of Representatives from the 13th district from 2013 to 2021, as Majority Leader from 2017 to 2019, and as Speaker from 2019 to 2021, as a member of the Democratic Party. Prior to her tenure in the state legislature, she served on the city council in Boulder, Colorado.

On November 18, 2021, it was announced that President Joe Biden selected Becker to be the head of the EPA for the mountain and plains region.

Early life and education

Kathleen Collins Becker graduated from the College of William & Mary with a Bachelor of Arts in government in 1991, from Lewis & Clark College with a Juris Doctor in 1996, and from the Daniels College of Business at University of Denver with a Master of Science in 2005. She worked as an attorney for the United States Department of the Interior and later moved to Boulder, Colorado, in 2002. She is married to Miles Kunkel, with whom she had two children.

Career

Boulder city council

Becker was elected to a four-year term in a seat on Boulder's city council in 2009. During her tenure she served as the council's representative to the Denver Regional Council of Governments.

Colorado House of Representatives

Elections

Becker announced in 2013, that she would run for a seat in the Colorado House of Representatives from the 13th district which was held by retiring incumbent Representative Claire Levy. Levy resigned to become the executive director of the Colorado Center on Law and Policy and Becker was appointed by a thirty-five-member vacancy committee to fill the vacancy caused by the resignation. Becker won with seventeen votes in favor and twelve votes against her and four of the committee members were absent, one recused himself, and another abstained. Becker won in the 2014 election against Republican nominee Michael James Ocevar. She faced no opposition in the 2016 election. She defeated Republican nominee Kevin Sipple in the 2018 election.

Becker was unable to seek reelection in 2020 due to term limits. She endorsed Judy Amabile in the Democratic primary to succeed her and Amabile won in the primary and general election. Garnett was selected to succeed Becker as Speaker without opposition.

Tenure

Backer served on the eleven-member board of directors of the Colorado Housing and Finance Authority from 2019 to 2020. After the 2020 presidential election she dismissed a request by Republicans to investigate Colorado's election software and voting machines stating that the Republicans were supporting "debunked conspiracy theories".

She was selected to serve as Majority Leader in 2017. During her tenure as Majority Leader she oversaw the expulsion of Representative Steve Lebsock, the first representative expelled from the state house since 1915, due to sexual harassment allegations against Lebsock. The state house voted 52 to 9 in favor of expelling Lebsock, with Becker voting in favor despite initially opposing the expulsion. In 2018, Becker was selected to replace Crisanta Duran, who was term-limited, as speaker of the House of Representatives for the 2019 legislative session and Alec Garnett replaced Becker as majority leader.

Electoral history

References

External links

|-

21st-century American politicians
Colorado city council members
Living people
Politicians from Boulder, Colorado
Place of birth missing (living people)
Speakers of the Colorado House of Representatives
Democratic Party members of the Colorado House of Representatives
Year of birth missing (living people)